The following is a list of releases by independent record label Party Smasher Inc. The label was founded by Ben Weinman of the Dillinger Escape Plan in 2009. In May 2016, Party Smasher partnered with Cooking Vinyl for global distribution, any release after this time was released in partnership with Party Smasher unless otherwise stated.

Discography

References 

Discographies of American record labels